Scelotes bipes, the silvery dwarf burrowing skink or common burrowing skink, is a species of lizard which is endemic to South Africa.

References

bipes
Reptiles of South Africa
Reptiles described in 1766
Taxa named by Carl Linnaeus